Clocental (dolcental) is a carbamate-derived sedative hypnotic.  It can be prepared by the ethynylation of cyclohexanone followed by reaction with allophanyl chloride.

See also
 1-Ethynylcyclohexanol
 Methylpentynol

References

Ethynyl compounds
Carbamates
Hypnotics
Sedatives
GABAA receptor positive allosteric modulators